Henry James (3 July 1952 – 19 December 2015), better known as Peter Broggs, was a Jamaican roots reggae vocalist and songwriter.

Life 
Born in 1952 in Hanover Parish, Jamaica, in the early 1970s, Broggs moved to Kingston to seek out business opportunities. 

Broggs' debut album Progressive Youth, was released in 1979 on the UK Greensleeves label. The song "Jah Golden Throne" was recorded at the Channel One Studios and King Tubby studios then released in the UK on the short-lived Selena imprint in 1980. His Rastafari Liveth! album was the first release on RAS Records in 1982. On his 1990 album Reasoning, Broggs was backed by The Wailers and Roots Radics. In 2000 he released Jah Golden Throne, a collaboration with Jah Warrior. 

Broggs suffered a stroke on 27 August 2004 which left him paralyzed on the right side and hardly able to speak. The album Igzabihir Yakal released in 2005 was recorded with Dubcreator at the DC studio for sound system team King Shiloh in Amsterdam in 2002 where the profit helped to cover Broggs' medical expenses.

Peter Broggs died on 19 December 2015, aged 63.

Discography 
 Progressive Youth (1979), Greensleeves
 Rastafari Liveth (1982), RAS
 Rise and Shine (1985), RAS
 Cease the War (1987), RAS
 Reasoning (1990), RAS
 Reggae In Blues (1993), Déclic
 Peter Broggs Sings for the Children (1993), Golden Harvest
 Rejoice (1997), RAS
 Jah Golden Throne (2000), Jah Warrior
 Jah Golden Throne Dubwise (2000), Jah Warrior
 Igzabihir Yakal (2005), King Shiloh
 Fire Fe Lucifer (2009), Jah Warrior
  Never Give Up (2009), Jah Warrior

Compilations
 RAS Portraits: Peter Broggs (1997), RAS
 Never Forget Jah - The Early Years 1976-1986 (2001), Nocturne
 This Is Crucial Reggae (2005), Sabctuary

References

External links

1954 births
Jamaican reggae musicians
2015 deaths
People from Hanover Parish